Kepler-17 is a main-sequence yellow dwarf star that is much more active than the Sun with starspots covering roughly 6% of its surface. Starspots are long-lived, with at least one persisting for 1400 days.

Planetary system
The Kepler-17 is known to host one superjovian exoplanet, Kepler-17b, in orbit around it. It was discovered by transit method in 2011.

References

https://web.archive.org/web/20111113211334/http://exoplanet.eu/star.php?st=Kepler-17&showPubli=yes&sortByDate

Cygnus (constellation)
G-type main-sequence stars
Planetary transit variables
203
Planetary systems with one confirmed planet
J19533486+4748540